Johann Balthasar Bullinger (30 November 1713, Langnau am Albis – 31 March 1793, Zürich) was a Swiss landscape painter.

Life
Bullinger was born in Langnau am Albis, the son of Heinrich Bullinger, a clergyman.
He then went to Venice, carrying a letter of introduction to Anton Maria Zanetti,  who introduced him to Tiepolo, in whose studio he worked from 1732 until 1735. He first attempted historical painting, but then turned to landscapes, painting his first works in that genre in Steinbrugg in 1736. In 1737 he worked as a portraitist in Neuenburg. He spent the years between 1738 and 1741 in Amsterdam, where his work came under the influence of Dutch artists such as Both and Berchem. Bullinger also created the ceiling and wall paintings of the Zunfthaus zur Meisen, a guild house and present faience museum that was built at the Münsterhof plaza in Zürich in 1757.

He died at Zurich in 1793.

Etchings
He etched several plates in a free, painterly style; they include:
The Portrait of J. B. Bullinger; se ipse fec.
A Frontispiece, with a number of Genii.
Two Mountainous Landscapes, with figures.
A set of fifty Landscapes; some from his own designs, and the others after J. F. Ermels and F. Meyer.
A Head; after Le Brun; engraved for Lavater's Work.

References

Sources

External links

18th-century Swiss painters
18th-century Swiss male artists
Swiss male painters
1713 births
1793 deaths
People from Horgen District
Swiss landscape painters